Welcome Home is a 1935 American comedy film directed by James Tinling and starring James Dunn, Arline Judge, Raymond Walburn, Rosina Lawrence, William Frawley and Charles Sellon. Written by Marion Orth and Paul Gerard Smith, the film was released on August 9, 1935, by 20th Century-Fox Film Corporation.

Plot

Elmdale's chamber of commerce is all but broke. A decision is made to spend what remains of the budget on a reunion that hopefully will entice one of America's wealthiest men, Andrew Anstruther, to return to the place of his birth and build a new factory there.

Con men get wind of it. Richard "Dickie" Foster is the brains of a quartet of con-artists that includes 'Giltedge', a fake bond salesman; 'Painless', a gold-tooth-stealing phoney dentist; and 'Gorgeous', Dickies girlfriend. They have already taken the town for $10,000 in bogus bonds.

Anstruther takes a liking to Dickie, but Giltedge swindles the millionaire out of $36,000 for worthless bonds. Dickie bets on a horse for Susan's sake to win the money back, but the horse loses. The crooks are charged with murder after Anstruther vanishes, but he turns up just in time to vouch for Dickie as a friend. After he learns Susan has a boyfriend, Dickie goes back to the arms of Gorgeous, who tells him, "Welcome home."

Cast 

James Dunn as Richard Foster
Arline Judge as Gorgeous
Raymond Walburn as Giltedge
Rosina Lawrence as Susan Adams
William Frawley as Painless
Charles Sellon as Andrew Anstruther
Charles Ray as Andrew Carr
Frank Melton as Willis Parker
George Meeker as Edward Adams
James Burke as Michael Shaughnessy
Arthur Hoyt as Titwillow
Dave O'Brien as Stanley Phillips
Spencer Charters as Constable Mulhausen
Harry Holman as Flink
Sarah Edwards as Mrs. Edwards
Mamie Stark As Pianist
Florence Gill As Singer
George Chandler as Barber

References

External links 
 

1935 films
Fox Film films
American comedy films
1935 comedy films
Films directed by James Tinling
American black-and-white films
1930s English-language films
1930s American films